The 45 Session is an album by American trombonist Bennie Green recorded in 1958 but first released on the Japanese Blue Note label in 1975 as Minor Revelation. The tracks were originally intended for release as 45 rpm singles.

Reception

The Allmusic review by Stephen Thomas Erlewine awarded the album 4 stars and stated "it's a bit frustrating to hear the songs in truncated form, but since that's the only way they exist, fans should cherish what we do have. And this is music to cherish. Green's Blue Note recordings are consistently fun, and this is no exception. Each song swings with energy, offering each instrumentalist a chance to shine... the music is as appealing today as when it was recorded".

Track listing

Recorded at Rudy Van Gelder Studio, Hackensack, New Jersey on November 23, 1958.

Personnel
Bennie Green - trombone
Eddie Williams - tenor saxophone
Sonny Clark - piano
Paul Chambers - bass
Jerry Segal - drums
Babs Gonzales - vocals (tracks 5 & 9)

References 

Blue Note Records albums
Bennie Green albums
1975 albums
Albums recorded at Van Gelder Studio